Teungueth Football Club is a professional Senegalese football club based in Rufisque. Teungueth is currently playing in the Senegalese Premier League and is ranked 11th on the league table. They play at the Stade Lat-Dior in Thiès.

References 

Senegalese football clubs in international competitions
Senegal Premier League clubs
Football clubs in Senegal
Sports clubs in Dakar